Constance Howard may refer to:
 Constance Howard (actress)
 Constance Howard (artist)
 Constance A. Howard, member of the Illinois House of Representatives